1793 Zoya, provisional designation , is a stony Florian asteroid from the inner regions of the asteroid belt, approximately 9 kilometers in diameter. It was discovered on 28 February 1968, by Russian astronomer Tamara Smirnova at the Crimean Astrophysical Observatory in Nauchnyj, on the Crimean peninsula, and named after World War II partisan Zoya Kosmodemyanskaya.

Orbit and classification 

Zoya is a member of the Flora family, a large group of stony S-type asteroids in the inner main-belt. It orbits the Sun in the inner main-belt at a distance of 2.0–2.4 AU once every 3 years and 4 months (1,211 days). Its orbit has an eccentricity of 0.10 and an inclination of 2° with respect to the ecliptic.

Physical characteristics

Rotation period 

In May 2008, a rotational lightcurve of Zoya was obtained from photometric observations taken by astronomer James W. Brinsfield , giving a rotation period of 5.753 hours with a brightness variation of 0.40 magnitude, superseding a previous period of 7.0 hours obtained by Claes-Ingvar Lagerkvist in 1978. Modeled lightcurves published in 2016, gave a period of 5.751872 and 5.75187, respectively.

Diameter and albedo 

According to the survey carried out by NASA's Wide-field Infrared Survey Explorer with its subsequent NEOWISE mission, Zoya measures 8.35 kilometers in diameter, and its surface has an albedo of 0.334, while the Collaborative Asteroid Lightcurve Link assumes an albedo of 0.24 – derived from 8 Flora, the largest member and namesake of this asteroid family – and calculates a diameter of 9.41 kilometers with an absolute magnitude of 12.3.

Naming 

This minor planet was named in memory of Zoya Kosmodemyanskaya (1923–1941), Hero of the Soviet Union, partisan who died at the age of 18 during World War II in the Great Patriotic War. The minor planets 2072 Kosmodemyanskaya and 1977 Shura were named in honour of her mother and brother. The official  was published by the Minor Planet Center on 1 July 1972.

References

External links 
 Asteroid Lightcurve Database (LCDB), query form (info )
 Dictionary of Minor Planet Names, Google books
 Asteroids and comets rotation curves, CdR – Observatoire de Genève, Raoul Behrend
 Discovery Circumstances: Numbered Minor Planets (1)-(5000) – Minor Planet Center
 
 

001793
Discoveries by Tamara Mikhaylovna Smirnova
Named minor planets
19680228